Leonard Scott may refer to:
 Leonard Scott (athlete), American sprinter
 Leonard Scott (musician), American gospel musician and pastor
 Leonard E. Scott, member of the Iowa House of Representatives

See also
 Robert Leonard Ewing Scott, American convicted murderer, also known as L. Ewing Scott